Valère Amoussou (born 10 March 1987 in Cotonou) is a Beninese football player who, is currently playing for AS Porto-Novo.

Career
Amoussou began his career with Mogas 90 FC and joined in January 2008 to AS Porto-Novo.

International
He was part of the Beninese 2008 African Nations Cup team, who finished bottom of their group in the first round of competition, thus failing to qualify for the next round. Amoussou played his first game on 29 January 2008 against Nigeria national football team and his first call was in 2006.

References

External links
 

1987 births
Living people
Beninese footballers
Benin international footballers
2010 Africa Cup of Nations players
People from Cotonou
Mogas 90 FC players

Association football goalkeepers
AS Oussou Saka players